Boarder's Buddy is a freeride magazine for snowboarders and skiers. It was published by eight Austrian editors and graphic designers. Boarder's Buddy presents the freeride areas in Austria in an independent way with the aim to point out each spot's assets. Every spot is given with detailed graphics, photos and texts.

References

External links
Boarder's Buddy website

Magazines published in Austria
Magazines with year of establishment missing
Snowboarding magazines